Luis Acosta Mena (born 13 July 1994) is a Spanish footballer who plays for Unionistas de Salamanca CF as a central defender.

Club career
Born in Cádiz, Andalusia, Acosta joined Atlético Madrid's youth setup in 2008 at the age of 14, from Cádiz CF. He was promoted to the C-team in July 2013, but never appeared for the side due to injury.

On 19 December 2013 Acosta was loaned to Tercera División side RCD Carabanchel, until the end of the season. On 8 August 2014, he joined CD Olímpic de Xàtiva of the Segunda División B.

In July 2015 Acosta signed for another reserve team, CF Pobla de Mafumet also of the third division. The following year he moved to Getafe CF B of the fourth level.

Acosta made his first-team debut on 12 November 2016, starting and being booked in a 0–1 away loss against Gimnàstic de Tarragona in the Segunda División. He left Geta in the following 24 August, signing for CD Eldense in the fourth division.

On 25 January 2018, Acosta returned to the third division after agreeing to a contract with CDA Navalcarnero. On 8 July, he signed a two-year contract with fellow league team Burgos CF, but moved to CD Guijuelo on loan on 31 December.

On 1 November 2019, after spending the first months of the season without a club, Acosta signed for Albacete Balompié's B-team in division four. The following 21 September, he returned to the third tier after agreeing to a deal with Unionistas de Salamanca CF.

References

External links

1994 births
Living people
Spanish footballers
Footballers from Cádiz
Association football defenders
Segunda División players
Segunda División B players
Tercera División players
Atlético Madrid C players
CD Olímpic de Xàtiva footballers
CF Pobla de Mafumet footballers
Getafe CF B players
Getafe CF footballers
CD Eldense footballers
CDA Navalcarnero players
Burgos CF footballers
CD Guijuelo footballers
Atlético Albacete players
Unionistas de Salamanca CF players
Spain youth international footballers